Bromsgroveia is an extinct genus of predatory ctenosauriscid archosaur from the Middle Triassic Bromsgrove Sandstone of England. Ctenosauriscids were a group of rauisuchians that was related to the ancestors of modern crocodiles and alligators.

Classification
Bromsgroveia was closely related to Ctenosauriscus, and together with a few other genera they make up Ctenosauriscidae. The ctenosauriscids were closely related to the poposaurids, as shown by a few shared derived characteristics. The pelvic girdle in Bromsgroveia unites this taxon with Ctenosauriscus, Lotosaurus, Arizonasaurus, and Hypselorhachus.

Below is a phylogenetic cladogram simplified from Butler et al. in 2011 showing the cladistics of Archosauriformes, focusing mostly on Pseudosuchia:

References

Ctenosauriscids
Extinct animals of Europe
Prehistoric pseudosuchian genera